William Edward Lamar "Will" Rothhaar (born January 12, 1987) is an American actor.

Early life 
Rothlaar was born in New York City, the son of Michael Rothhaar and Nancy Linehan Charles, both of whom are playwrights, actors and directors.

He briefly lived in the little resort town of Boiling Springs, Pennsylvania, where he started doing theatre, but grew up on the west side of Los Angeles and attended Alexander Hamilton High School.

Career 
Rothhaar began acting in the mid-1990s, and appeared in several made-for-television films and series, including Buffy the Vampire Slayer and Mad About You. He had supporting roles in several feature films, including Jack Frost and Hearts in Atlantis. In 1999, he received The Hollywood Reporter "Young Star Award" for his portrayal of John in David Mamet's The Cryptogram at the Geffen Playhouse. Rothhaar's biggest role to date was the leading role in Kart Racer (2003). In 2004, he had a starring role on Listen Up!. He appeared in Must Love Dogs (2005) and as Cpl. Lee Imlay in the alien-invasion film Battle: Los Angeles (2011). He appeared on two episodes of CSI: Crime Scene Investigation (in 2004 and 2010, respectively), CSI: Miami (2011), and CSI: New York (2012), playing different characters each time. In 2013, he starred as Lee Harvey Oswald in the television film Killing Kennedy.

Filmography

Film

Television

Web

References

External links
 

1987 births
20th-century American male actors
21st-century American male actors
American male child actors
American male film actors
American male television actors
Living people
Male actors from New York City